Repli-Kate is a 2002 American sex comedy film from National Lampoon, directed by Frank Longo and starring Ali Landry, James Roday, Desmond Askew and Eugene Levy.

Plot 
Max Fleming is a graduate student who has developed a powerful cloning machine for the egotistical Dr. Jonas. Jonas steals all the credit and leaves Max to toil in obscurity. One day, Max meets Kate Carson, a young and beautiful magazine reporter preparing a story on the cloning research at the university. During the interview, Kate accidentally cuts herself, and a few drops of her blood mingle with one of the cloning samples. Later that night, Max runs a test of the machine, and to his surprise he ends up with a replicant of Kate, which he names Repli-Kate.

Repli-Kate is fully adult (being exactly the same age the original Kate is), but she has no knowledge. Max and his roommate Henry thus set out to educate her, but with a male perspective. They want to turn her into the perfect woman: the beer-drinking, sport-loving, sexually aggressive girl of their dreams. She also becomes Max's girlfriend as result. However, when Max contemplates the resulting woman, he realizes that the girl of his dreams was Kate all along, not Repli-Kate.

Meanwhile, Dr. Jonas learns of the existence of Repli-Kate. He captures both her and the original Kate. He then decides to present the results of the human cloning in front of scientists from all over the world, with the aim of advertising "his" cloning machine. Max and Henry learn of Jonas's plan, and they formulate a rescue mission. Using a newly created Repli-Jonas, the pair are able to create enough confusion to save Kate and Repli-Kate.

Jonas and Repli-Jonas are sent to a cloning research lab as test subjects. Max inherits the university's cloning lab, and his cloning chamber brings him great fame and money. Max and Kate fall in love, as do Henry and Repli-Kate. Repli-Jonas manages to escape, and when Felix asks Max about what to do, he replies that Repli-Jonas is too dumb to go anywhere. The last image is Repli-Jonas, who is the new president. His discourse is just the word 'penis'.

Cast 
 Ali Landry as Kate Carson/Repli-Kate
 James Roday as Max Fleming
 Desmond Askew as Henry
 Eugene Levy as Professor Jonas Fromer/Repli-Jonas
 Kurt Fuller as President Chumley

External links 
 
 

2002 films
2000s sex comedy films
National Lampoon films
2000s English-language films
Films about cloning
Films scored by Teddy Castellucci
American sex comedy films
2002 comedy films
2000s American films